The 2016 Okolo Slovenska was a six-day cycling stage race that took place in Slovakia in June 2016. The race is the 60th edition of the Okolo Slovenska. It was rated as a 2.2 event as part of the 2016 UCI Europe Tour. The race included five stages+Prologue, starting in Banská Bystrica on 7 June and returning there for the finish on 12 June in Piešťany.

Schedule

Participating teams
Twenty-four (24) team participated in the 2016 edition of the Okolo Slovenska.

Stages

Prologue
7 June 2016 – Banská Bystrica, individual time trial (ITT)

Stage 1
8 June 2016 – Banská Bystrica to Banská Bystrica via (Sliač),

Stage 2
9 June 2016 – Banská Bystrica to Štrbské Pleso,

Stage 3
10 June 2016 – Štrbské Pleso to Zuberec,

Stage 4
11 June 2016 – Zuberec to Bojnice,

Stage 5
12 June 2016 – Bojnice to Piešťany,

Classification leadership table

Final standings

General classification

Points classification

Mountains classification

Young riders classification (U23)

Best Slovak rider classification

Team classification

References

External links
 Official website

Okolo Slovenska 2016
Okolo Slovenska
Okolo Slovenska
Okolo Slovenska